The 7th World Freestyle Skating Championships were held in Taipei City, Taiwan from November 5 to November 8, 2013. 24 countries took part in the competition

Participating nations
24 nations entered the competition.

Medallists

Medal table

References

External links
Event website

Roller skating competitions
2013 in Taiwanese sport
2010s in Taipei
2013 in roller sports